The Sloans Ferry Bridge is a four-lane automobile bridge spanning the Catawba River/Lake Wylie between Belmont, in Gaston County, and Charlotte, in Mecklenburg County.  The bridge carries US 29/US 74 and is utilized mostly by local traffic.

History

Sloans Ferry Bridge I
The bridge replaced Sloan's Ferry service, which the bridge was named after. The bridge was damaged by major flooding in July, 1916 and could not be rebuilt till around or after 1920, when it received Federal Aid that help rebuild the bridge as part of the National Highway. In 1921, it became part of NC 20; in 1927, it also became part of US 29/US 74.

Sloans Ferry Bridge II
The second and current bridge was built 1933 and replaced the first Sloans Ferry Bridge. Plaques on the bridge show that it was erected as a memorial to the men of the counties of Mecklenburg and Gaston who served in the world war (1917-1918). Originally built as a two-lane bridge with shoulders for pedestrians and temporary parking, it was widen to four-lanes in the 1950s.

Future
The North Carolina Department of Transportation (NCDOT) plans to replace the Sloans Ferry Bridge with two new three-lane bridges, which will also include bike lanes and a pedestrian walkway. At a cost of $37 million, which includes replacement bridges over the South Fork River, construction is expected to begin in 2022, but may be expedited. Possible plans may include deck space to accommodate mass transit such as light rail.

See also

References

External links
 

Buildings and structures in Gaston County, North Carolina
Buildings and structures in Mecklenburg County, North Carolina
Bridges completed in 1933
Road bridges in North Carolina
U.S. Route 29
U.S. Route 74
Bridges of the United States Numbered Highway System
Steel bridges in the United States
Catawba River